Kemal Sadri Özün (born 18 May 1964) is a Turkish swimmer. He competed in four events at the 1984 Summer Olympics.

References

1964 births
Living people
Turkish male swimmers
Olympic swimmers of Turkey
Swimmers at the 1984 Summer Olympics
Place of birth missing (living people)
20th-century Turkish people